David Richard Borkowski (born February 7, 1977) is an American former professional baseball relief pitcher He began his Major League Baseball (MLB) career in 1999 with the Detroit Tigers, and briefly appeared with the Baltimore Orioles in 2004. From 2006 to 2008, he played for the Houston Astros. Borkowski spent part of the 2009 season in the Philadelphia Phillies organization but did not get the call.
 
In 2018, he became the pitching coach for the Tulsa Drillers. He was promoted to pitching coach for the Oklahoma City Dodgers in 2022.

High school years
Borkowski attended Sterling Heights High School in Sterling Heights, Michigan and was a letterman in basketball and baseball.

References

External links

1977 births
Living people
American expatriate baseball players in Canada
Baltimore Orioles players
Baseball coaches from Michigan
Baseball players from Detroit
Bowie Baysox players
Detroit Tigers players
Erie SeaWolves players
Fayetteville Generals players
Gulf Coast Tigers players
Houston Astros players
Jacksonville Suns players
Lakeland Tigers players
Lehigh Valley IronPigs players
Major League Baseball pitchers
Minor league baseball coaches
Ottawa Lynx players
Round Rock Express players
Sportspeople from Sterling Heights, Michigan
Toledo Mud Hens players
West Michigan Whitecaps players